earthmine, inc. is a company located in Berkeley, California devoted to "indexing reality". The company uses vehicle mounted camera rigs to capture imagery and three dimensional data of the urban environment.  It was founded in 2006 by John Ristevski and Anthony Fassero.

Technology
earthmine uses technology licensed from the Jet Propulsion Laboratory to capture 3D data at regular intervals while driving.  Collection is accomplished with the MARS collection system, which employs a set of cameras mounted to the roof of a car.  As of November 2009, earthmine has established a network of collection partners in the United States and around the world.

The collected data is processed to create a library of 3D panoramic imagery, from which measurements can be made. A set of tools exists so that users can access this data through a flash application or a smart phone.

In May, 2009, earthmine introduced "Wild Style City", a web based model of San Francisco with surfaces where visitors
can add graffiti to virtual walls.

In November, 2012 Nokia acquired earthmine's map service.

Award
earthmine was the recipient of the 2007 Crunchie Award for "Best Technology Innovation/Achievement".

See also
 EveryScape
 Eye2eye Software
 Google Street View
 MapJack

References

External links
 
 Wild Style City

Map companies of the United States
Companies based in Berkeley, California
Technology companies established in 2006
2006 establishments in California
Privately held companies based in California